Piotr Skowyrski, also known as Izak, is a Polish esports commentator, YouTube content creator, Twitch streamer, and former professional Counter-Strike player. He played for Team VEGA and iNET koxXx in Counter-Strike: Source and Counter-Strike: Global Offensive. He is the owner of a Polish esports organisation, Izako Boars and the Polish esports website, IzakTV.

Career 
Skowyrski has commentated important tournaments in Counter-Strike: Global Offensive, such as Copenhagen Games 2014 and GeForce Cup 2017. He also commentated on several CS:GO major tournaments: PGL Major: Kraków 2017 and Faceit Major: London 2018.

At the invitation of Telewizja Polska, Izak debuted as football commentator during a Poland – Netherlands friendly match, played before Euro 2016, where he worked with Maciej Iwański. Izak commentated every subsequent match for Poland in this championship. In 2018, he appeared as a TVP commentator during FIFA World Cup in Russia.

Along with Patryk “Rojo” Rojewski and Remigiusz “Rock” Maciaszek, Izak took part in the Polish dubbing for Battlefield 1.

References

External links 
 IzakTV webpage
 Twitch channel
 Steam community profile

Living people

Year of birth missing (living people)

Polish esports players

Esports commentators
Polish YouTubers
Sportspeople from Warsaw
Entertainers from Warsaw
Counter-Strike players